Telekom Networks Malawi plc (TNM), is a telecommunications service provider in Malawi. Established in 1995, it is the oldest telecommunications company in the country. The telco is a subsidiary of Press Corporation Limited, the largest business conglomerate in Malawi.

Location
The headquarters of the company are located on the Fifth Floor, Livingstone Towers, Glyn Jones Road, in the city of Blantyre, Malawi's business capital. The geographical coordinates of the company headquarters are:15°47'08.0"S,  35°00'26.0"E (Latitude:-15.785556; Longitude:35.007222).

Overview
Telekom Networks Malawi is a leading telecommunications network provider in the country. As of December 2020, the telco had assets worth MWK:120,528,540,000 (US$155.6 million), with shareholders equity worth  MWK:43,905,850,000 (US$56.7 million). At that time,  the company serviced in excess of 4 million customers, through 26 customer-service stores throughout the country.

History
Telekom Networks Malawi (TNM) was established in 1995 as a joint venture between Telekom Malaysia (60 percent) and Malawi Postal and Telecommunications Corporation (MPTC) (40 percent). MPTC was owned by the government of Malawi. Later, MPTC was unbundled into (a) Malawi Posts Corporation (MPC) and (b) Malawi Telecommunications Limited (MTL). The shares of stock of Telekom Networks Malawi were listed on the Malawi Stock Exchange in 2008. Telekom Malaysia sold its 60% majority stake in TNM, and the enterprise is now wholly Malawian-owned.

Ownership
Telekom Networks Malawi (TNM), company number 4029, was the pioneer mobile network in Malawi, and it is listed on the Malawi Stock Exchange, where it trades under the symbol TNM. As of 31 December 2018, the major shareholders in the stock of TNM are as illustrated in the table below.

Governance
The eight-person board of directors is chaired by George Partridge. The chief executive officer is Arnold Mbwana.

Sponsorship
The TNM Super League is TNM's major sponsorship property, and it is Malawi's elite football league, competed for by 16 teams from across Malawi. TNM ventured into football sponsorship in 2007 and its current agreement runs up to 2020.

This sponsorship agreement includes the sponsorship of football equipment, awards to teams and individual players, awards to media personalities who promote the league, cash subventions to the teams in the league and administration fees to Super League of Malawi (SULOM) who are the league managers.

The league runs from April to December and relegates three bottom teams, who are replaced by those that emerge champions in the country's three regional leagues.

See also
 First Capital Bank Malawi Limited

References

External links
 Official Website

Telecommunications companies of Malawi
Telecommunications companies established in 1995
1995 establishments in Malawi
Companies listed on Malawi Stock Exchange